The 2021 Doha motorcycle Grand Prix (officially known as the Tissot Grand Prix of Doha) was the second round of the 2021 Grand Prix motorcycle racing season. It was added to the calendar as a response to the COVID-19 pandemic. It was held at the Losail International Circuit in Lusail on 4 April 2021.

Background

Impact of the COVID-19 pandemic 

On 22 January 2021 Dorna announced a significant update of the provisional calendar following the postponement of the Argentine and American Grands Prix, originally scheduled as the second and third rounds of the championship (on 11 and 18 April respectively) due to the COVID-19 situation in both countries, with potential rescheduling for the last quarter of 2021. The organizers of the Qatar Grand Prix have signed a contract with Dorna Sports, owner of the sport's commercial rights, to host a double stage at the Losail International Circuit, becoming the sixth circuit in the history to host two consecutive World Championship races, and is the first time to be held in Qatar. The race is named after the city of Doha, where the circuit is located just outside the city of Lusail, north of Doha.

MotoGP Championship standings before the race 
After winning the Qatar Grand Prix, Maverick Viñales leads the riders' ranking with 25 points, followed by Johann Zarco (20), Francesco Bagnaia (16), Joan Mir (13) and Fabio Quartararo (11).

In the constructors' classification, Yamaha is first at 25 points, followed by Ducati at 20 points. Suzuki is third at 13 points, with Aprilia and Honda following with 9 and 8 points respectively. KTM closes with 3 points.

In the team championship standings, Monster Energy Yamaha leads with 36 points, 13 more than Ducati Lenovo Team and Team Suzuki Ecstar and 15 more than Pramac Racing. Repsol Honda Team is fifth at 13 points.

Moto2 Championship riders' standings before the race 
After the first race of the season, Sam Lowes leads the intermediate class with 25 points, 5 more than Remy Gardner, 9 more than Fabio Di Giannantonio, 12 more than Marco Bezzecchi and 14 more than Raúl Fernández.

Moto3 Championship riders' standings before the race 
In the lightest class the top five places are occupied by Jaume Masiá, with 25 points, Pedro Acosta (20), Darryn Binder (16), Sergio García (13) and Gabriel Rodrigo (11).

MotoGP participants 
Stefan Bradl replaced Marc Márquez in the second leg of the season as well, as Márquez extended his recovery from the end-of-season 2020 injury.

Moto2 participants 
Tommaso Marcon replaced Simone Corsi for this round because of an injury.

Moto3 participants 
The drivers and teams were the same as the season entry list with no additional stand-in riders for the race.

Free practice

MotoGP 
In the first session, Aleix Espargaró finished at the top of the standings ahead of Álex Rins and Maverick Viñales. In the second session three Ducatis were the fastest, with Jack Miller the fastest, followed by Francesco Bagnaia and Johann Zarco. In the third session, Fabio Quartararo was the best ahead of Rins and Joan Mir's Suzuki

Combined Free Practice 1-2-3 
The top ten bikers (written in bold) qualified in Q2.

The fastest personal time of the bikers are written in bold type.

Free Practice 4 
Zarco was the fastest of the session, ahead of Viñales and Mir.

Moto2 
In the first session, Fabio Di Giannantonio was the fastest, followed by Marco Bezzecchi and Joe Roberts. In the second session, Raúl Fernández preceded Di Giannantonio and Roberts. In the third session Sam Lowes finished at the top of the standings, ahead of Bezzecchi and Remy Gardner.

Combined Free Practice 
The top fourteen bikers (written in bold) qualified in Q2.

The fastest personal time of the bikers are written in bold type.

Moto3 
In the first session, Jaume Masiá was the fastest, followed by Dennis Foggia and Filip Salač. In the second session, Darryn Binder finished at the top, with Sergio García and Gabriel Rodrigo second and third respectively. Jason Dupasquier was fastest in the third session, ahead of Foggia and John McPhee.

Combined Free Practice 
The top fourteen bikers (written in bold) qualified in Q2.

The fastest personal time of the bikers are written in bold type.

Qualifying

MotoGP

Moto2

Moto3 

 

Notes
  – Sergio García, Pedro Acosta, Romano Fenati, Stefano Nepa, Dennis Foggia, Riccardo Rossi and Deniz Öncü received a pit lane start penalty for irresponsible driving in the FP2.

Warm up

MotoGP 
Johann Zarco was the fastest, followed by Fabio Quartararo and Maverick Viñales.

Moto2 
Marco Bezzecchi finished the warm up in the lead ahead of Marcel Schrotter and Remy Gardner.

Moto3 
Jaume Masiá preceded Andrea Migno and Gabriel Rodrigo.

Race

MotoGP

Moto2

Moto3

Championship standings after the race
Below are the standings for the top five riders, constructors, and teams after the round.

MotoGP

Riders' Championship standings

Constructors' Championship standings

Teams' Championship standings

Moto2

Riders' Championship standings

Constructors' Championship standings

Teams' Championship standings

Moto3

Riders' Championship standings

Constructors' Championship standings

Teams' Championship standings

Notes

References

External links

Doha
Doha motorcycle Grand Prix
Doha motorcycle Grand Prix
MotoGP
Doha motorcycle Grand Prix